Sharon Ruth Browning is a statistical geneticist at the University of Washington, and a research professor with its Department of Biostatistics. Her research has various implications for the field of biogenetics.

Education and career 
Browning has a B.Sc.  from the University of Auckland (1995) and earned her Ph.D. in 1999 from the University of Washington. Following her Ph.D., she held positions at Texas A&M University, North Carolina State University, GlaxoSmithKline, and the University of Auckland before moving to the University of Washington in 2010.

Research 
Browning is known for her research developing statistical methods for analysis of population genetic data. Her early work established the used of Markov chain modeling to examine association based genome mapping. Her work addresses how to handle missing data in whole-genome association studies. She has also defined the use of group association tests and examined relatedness of individuals based on shared gene content. Browning has also examined the genetic history of the Samoans.

Browning and her research group also study the traces of genetic introgression from archaic humans into modern human DNA. In 2018, they discovered
that humans in the distant past had mated with Denisovans in at least two separate events, the second of which may have occurred as humans migrated eastward into Asia and Oceania.

Selected publications

References

External links 

Statistical geneticists
Living people
University of Washington faculty
American geneticists
1973 births
American women geneticists